Leiosaurus is a genus of lizards in the family Leiosauridae. The genus is endemic to South America.

Species
The genus Leiosaurus contains the following species which are recognized as being valid:

Leiosaurus bellii  – Bell's anole
Leiosaurus catamarcensis 
Leiosaurus jaguaris 
Leiosaurus paronae 

Nota bene: A binomial authority in parentheses indicates that the species was originally described in a genus other than Leiosaurus.

Etymology
The specific name, bellii, is in honor of English zoologist Thomas Bell, and the specific name, paronae, is in honor of Italian zoologist Corrado Parona.

References

Further reading
Boulenger GA (1885). Catalogue of the Lizards in the British Museum (Natural History). Second Edition. Volume II. Iguanidæ, .... London: Trustees of the British Museum (Natural History). (Taylor and Francis, printers). xiii + 497 pp. + Plates I- XXIV. (Genus Liosaurus [sic], p. 124).
Duméril AMC, Bibron G (1837). Erpétologie générale ou Histoire naturelle complète des Reptiles, Tome quatrième. Paris: Roret. ii + 571 pp. (Leiosaurus, new genus, p. 241). (in French).
Koslowsky J (1898). "Enumeración sistemática y distribución geográfica de los reptiles argentinos ". Revista del Museo de La Plata 8: 161-200. (Liosaurus [sic] catamarcensis, new species, pp. 169–170 + Plate I). (in Spanish).
Laspiur A, Acosta JC, Abdala CS (2007). "A new species of Leiosaurus (Iguania: Leiosauridae) from central-western Argentina". Zootaxa 1470: 47-57, 7 plates. (Leiosaurus jaguaris, new species).

Leiosaurus
Lizard genera
Taxa named by André Marie Constant Duméril
Taxa named by Gabriel Bibron